Beverly Hills Cop is a 1984 American action comedy film starring Eddie Murphy and Judge Reinhold.

Beverly Hills Cop may also refer to:
 Beverly Hills Cop (franchise), the series of films that began with Beverly Hills Cop
 Beverly Hills Cop II, the 1987 sequel to the 1984 film
 Beverly Hills Cop III, the 1994 sequel to the 1987 film
 Beverly Hills Cop (soundtrack), the soundtrack album corresponding to the film
 Beverly Hills Cop (video game), a 1990 computer game by Tynesoft, loosely based on the film
 Beverly Hills Cop (2006 video game), for PlayStation 2